Azerbaijan elects on a national level a head of state—the president—and a legislature. The President of Azerbaijan is elected for a seven-year term by the people; before a constitutional referendum changed this in 2009, the position was limited to two terms. The National Assembly (Milli Məclis) has 125 members. Before 2005, 100 members were elected for a five-year term in single-seat constituencies and 25 members were elected by proportional representation. Since 2005 all 125 members are elected in single-seat constituencies. Azerbaijan is a one party dominant state. 
Each of political parties in Azerbaijan has the same rights and opportunities to compete in elections as defined in by the Constitution and respective laws. 
On Sunday, 9 February 2020, the most recent parliamentary elections were held. On Wednesday, 11 April 2018, the most recent presidential election was held.

Latest elections

2020 Azerbaijani parliamentary election

2018 Presidential election

Past elections

Presidential elections
2013 Azerbaijani presidential election
2008 Azerbaijani presidential election
2003 Azerbaijani presidential election
1998 Azerbaijani presidential election
1993 Azerbaijani presidential election
1992 Azerbaijani presidential election
1991 Azerbaijani presidential election
1990 Azerbaijani presidential election

Parliamentary elections
2015 Azerbaijani parliamentary election
2010 Azerbaijani parliamentary election
2005 Azerbaijani parliamentary election
2000–2001 Azerbaijani parliamentary election
1995–1996 Azerbaijani parliamentary election
1990 Azerbaijani parliamentary election

Constitutional referendums
2009 Azerbaijani constitutional referendum
2002 Azerbaijani constitutional referendum
1995 Azerbaijani constitutional referendum

Other referendums
1993 Azerbaijani vote of confidence referendum
1991 Azerbaijani independence referendum

See also
 Electoral calendar
 Electoral system

External links
Adam Carr's Election Archive
Azerbaijan – Parliamentary Elections, 2005